Grupo União Sport de Montemor is a Portuguese football club located in Montemor-o-Novo, Portugal.

Colours and badge 
União de Montemor's badge and colors are black and white.

External links 
 Official website
 Soccerway Profile
 Fora de Jogo Profile

Football clubs in Portugal
Association football clubs established in 1927
1927 establishments in Portugal